David P. DeMille is an American physicist and Professor of Physics at the University of Chicago.  He is best known for his use of polar diatomic molecules to search for symmetry-violating effects within the molecules and as a means for manipulating the external properties of the molecules.

His group was the first to accomplish laser cooling of a diatomic molecule, achieved in 2010 using strontium monofluoride (SrF). He is also known for his precise measurements in the ACME EDM Experiment which constrain the upper limit of the electron electric dipole moment using a beam of thorium monoxide, conducted in collaboration with the groups of Gerald Gabrielse and John Doyle at Harvard. DeMille is currently also leading the CeNTREX collaboration, an experiment to measure the nuclear Schiff moment of the thallium nucleus inside a thallium fluoride molecule.

He was elected a fellow of the American Physical Society in 2005.

Selected bibliography 
 D DeMille (2015). "Diatomic molecules, a window onto fundamental physics".  Physics Today. 68 (12).
 D DeMille (2002). "Quantum computation with trapped polar molecules". Physical Review Letters. 88 (6).
 LD Carr, D DeMille, RV Krems, J Ye (2009). "Cold and ultracold molecules: science, technology and applications". New Journal of Physics. 11 (5).
 BC Regan, ED Commins, CJ Schmidt, D DeMille (2002). "New limit on the electron electric dipole moment". Physical review letters. 88 (7).

References

External links 
 DeMille Research Group

21st-century American physicists
Yale University faculty
Living people
Fellows of the American Physical Society
1964 births